The variance-gamma distribution, generalized Laplace distribution or Bessel function distribution is a continuous probability distribution that is defined as the normal variance-mean mixture where the mixing density is the gamma distribution. The tails of the distribution decrease more slowly than the normal distribution. It is therefore suitable to model phenomena where numerically large values are more probable than is the case for the normal distribution. Examples are returns from financial assets and turbulent wind speeds. The distribution was introduced in the financial literature by Madan and Seneta. The variance-gamma distributions form a subclass of the generalised hyperbolic distributions.

The fact that there is a simple expression for the moment generating function implies that simple expressions for all moments are available. The class of variance-gamma distributions is closed under convolution in the following sense.

The variance-gamma distribution can also be expressed in terms of three inputs parameters (C,G,M) denoted after the initials of its founders. If the "C",  here, parameter is integer then the distribution has a closed form 2-EPT distribution. See 2-EPT Probability Density Function. Under this restriction closed form option prices can be derived.

See also Variance gamma process.

Notes 

Continuous distributions
Infinitely divisible probability distributions